This is a list of session musicians — professional musicians who perform in individual sessions rather than being a permanent member of an ensemble.  The list covers those who are especially notable for such work.

List

 Abraham Laboriel Sr., bass guitar
Airto Moreira, percussion
Alex Acuña, drums, percussion
Bernard Purdie, drums
 Bob Babbitt, bass guitar
 Bobbye Hall, percussion  — one of the few female session musicians
 Bobby Keys, saxophone
 Carol Kaye, bass guitar — one of the few female session musicians
 David Sanborn, saxophone
 Fred Lonberg-Holm, cello
 Geraint Watkins, accordion, piano
 Jay Graydon, guitar
 Justo Almario, clarinet, flute, saxophone
 Karl Brazil, drummer
 Luis Conte, percussion
 Michael Lang, piano
 Mike Mogis, guitar and other instruments
 Milton McDonald, guitar
 Mitchell Coleman Jr., drums
 Nicky Hopkins, piano
Paulinho Da Costa, percussion
 Pino Palladino, bass guitar
Ramon "Ray" Yslas, drums
 Steve Cropper, guitar
 Wayne Jackson, trumpet — a regular house musician for Stax Records

References

Lists of musicians
Session musicians